Events from the year 2020 in Scotland

Incumbents 

 First Minister and Keeper of the Great Seal – Nicola Sturgeon
 Secretary of State for Scotland – Alister Jack

Events

January
29 January – MSPs vote 64–54 to back calls for a second Scottish independence referendum.

February
6 February – Derek Mackay resigns as Finance Secretary hours before delivering his budget following reports that he messaged a sixteen-year-old boy on social media over a period of several months.
14 February – Jackson Carlaw is elected as leader of the Scottish Conservative Party.
17 February – Kate Forbes is appointed as Finance Secretary, the first woman to hold the post.

March
1 March – COVID-19 pandemic in Scotland: Authorities confirm the first case of the global COVID-19 pandemic in Scotland, the index case of coronavirus being a traveller having returned from Italy.
13 March – COVID-19 pandemic in Scotland: Authorities confirm the first death from COVID-19 in Scotland.

April
3 April – The results of the 2020 Scottish Labour deputy leadership election are announced, in which Jackie Baillie is elected as the deputy leader of Scottish Labour.

June
21 June – The 'Peebles Hoard', comprising Bronze Age horse harness, a sword in its scabbard and other artefacts including a "rattle pendant", is discovered near Peebles in the Borders by a metal detectorist.
26 June – Glasgow hotel stabbings.

August
4 August – The Scottish Qualifications Authority issues moderated grades to school pupils who have not been able to take examinations due to the COVID-19 pandemic; on 10 August, Nicola Sturgeon publicly accepts that her government "did not get it right" over this procedure.
5 August – Following the resignation on 30 July of Jackson Carlaw as leader of the Scottish Conservatives, he is succeeded by Douglas Ross MP.
11 August – Ruth Davidson is appointed Leader of the Scottish Conservatives in the Scottish Parliament by Douglas Ross, becoming the Leader of the Opposition again.
12 August – Stonehaven derailment: A passenger train derails after striking a landslip near Stonehaven in Aberdeenshire, with 3 deaths.

October
15 October – Kintore railway station reopens.

November
25 November – Scotland becomes the first country in the world to make it a legal duty for period products to be available to anyone for free after the Period Products (Free Provision) (Scotland) Bill is approved.

Predicted and scheduled events

Deaths

January
6 January – Danny Masterton, footballer (Ayr United, Clyde) (born 1954)
12 January – Jackie Brown, boxer, Commonwealth Games gold medallist (1958), British and Commonwealth flyweight champion (1962–1963) (born 1935)
15 January – Bobby Brown, Hall of Fame footballer (Rangers, Queen's Park) and manager (national team) (born 1923)

February
6 February – Jimmy Moran, footballer (Norwich City, Northampton Town, Workington) (born 1935)

March
9 March – George Strachan, cricketer (national team) (born 1932)
11 March – Dave Souter, footballer (Clyde, Dundee) (born 1940)
12 March – Alexander Gordon, 7th Marquess of Aberdeen and Temair, peer (born 1955)
30 March – Alex Forsyth, footballer (Darlington) (born 1928)

April
5 April – Dougie Morgan, rugby union player  (Stewart's Melville, British and Irish Lions, national team) (born 1947)
14 April – Ron Wylie, footballer and manager (Notts County, Aston Villa, Birmingham City, West Bromwich Albion) (born 1933)
23 April – John Murphy, footballer (Ayr United) (born 1942)

May
1 May – Derek Ogg, lawyer (born 1954)
2 May – John Ogilvie, footballer (Hibernian, Leicester City, Mansfield Town), COVID-19 (born 1928)

July
9 July – Johnny Beattie, actor (River City) and comedian (Scotch & Wry, Rab C. Nesbitt) (born 1926)
13 July – Pat Quinn, footballer (Motherwell, national team) and manager (East Fife) (born 1936)
15 July – Maurice Roëves, actor (Oh! What a Lovely War, Escape to Victory, Judge Dredd) (born 1937)
17 July – Alex Dawson, footballer (Manchester United, Preston North End, Brighton & Hove Albion) (born 1940)
21 July – Hugh McLaughlin, footballer (St Mirren, Third Lanark, Queen of the South) (born 1945)
24 July – David Hagen, footballer (Falkirk, Clyde, Peterhead), motor neuron disease (born 1973)

August
4 August – Willie Hunter, footballer (Motherwell, national team) and manager (Queen of the South) (born 1940)

September
7 September – Logie Bruce Lockhart, rugby union player (national team), schoolmaster, writer and journalist (born 1921)
20 September – Sir Malcolm Innes of Edingight, herald, Lord Lyon King of Arms of Scotland (1981–2001) (born 1938)

December
21 December – Sandy Grant Gordon, whisky distiller (born 1931)
26 December – Jim McLean, footballer and manager (Dundee United) (born 1937)

The Arts
11 February – Douglas Stuart's debut novel Shuggie Bain, a story of growing up in 1980s Glasgow, is first published in the United States; it wins this year's Booker Prize.
October – Two of the five winners of the UK 2020 ArtFund Museum of the Year Award are Aberdeen Art Gallery and Gairloch Museum.

See also

 2020 in England
 2020 in Northern Ireland
 2020 in Wales

References 

 
2020s in Scotland
Years of the 21st century in Scotland
Scotland